Nameless Lake is a small, spring-fed endorheic lake on Manitoulin Island in Lake Huron approximately  south of the town of Gore Bay in the municipality of Gordon/Barrie Island, Manitoulin District in Northeastern Ontario, Canada. It is the only lake on Manitoulin Island that prohibits all gasoline-powered craft.

See also
List of lakes in Ontario

References 

Other map sources:

Lakes of Manitoulin Island
Endorheic lakes of Canada